The Richard Wall house, built 1682, is a historic home in Elkins Park, Pennsylvania.  It had continuous Wall family residency for over 150 years, having been in the Wall family and its descendants through 1847. It is listed in the National Register of Historic Places as "Wall House" also known as "The Ivy".

The home has undergone numerous renovations, with a section of basement wall being the only original construction remaining.  The site of religious meetings and weddings, it is also among the earliest places of Quaker worship still standing in the United States. It is now a museum located at Church Road and Wall Park Drive in Elkins Park.

History
Richard Wall was a founder of Cheltenham Township, Pennsylvania. He arrived with William Penn's group of Quakers in 1682. He and fourteen others pooled their land purchases to create the township. They named the township for the main town in Gloucestershire, England, where they apparently originated.

The Wall family was joined in marriage by the Shoemaker family. The families owned a corn grist mill on Tacony Creek. Descendants of the Walls lived in the house until 1847, followed by the Bosler family. In 1932 the township acquired the house and surrounding lands for  "Wall Park."  The house was rented from 1932 to 1979.  Harold C. Pike, (township manager) moved in 1941 and resided there until his death in 1978.  Since 1980 the house has been managed by the Cheltenham Township Historical Commission, which opened the museum and orientation center in 1993.

An original section of masonry wall can be seen in the current basement. The house was redesigned in 1730, 1760, and 1805. Later renovations added running water and electricity.

The permanent exhibits display elements of life during more than two hundred years of residence. Highlights include a fully furnished and electrified,  doll house created before 1920; and a collection of over 100 antique tools.

See also
List of the oldest buildings in Pennsylvania
List of the oldest buildings in the United States

References

Further reading 
 Rothschild, Elaine W., A History of Cheltenham Township. Pennsylvania: Cheltenham Township Historical Commission, 1976.

External links 

 Richard Wall House Museum at CheltenhamTownship.org
 Slideshow of The Richard Wall House by Russell Heimlich

Houses completed in 1682
Houses on the National Register of Historic Places in Pennsylvania
Museums in Montgomery County, Pennsylvania
Historic house museums in Pennsylvania
Houses in Montgomery County, Pennsylvania
Elkins Park, Pennsylvania
National Register of Historic Places in Montgomery County, Pennsylvania
1682 establishments in Pennsylvania